State Trunk Highway 27 (often called Highway 27, STH-27 or WIS 27) is a state highway in the U.S. state of Wisconsin. Earlier routing of the highway had it reaching Superior along the present US 53 and Fennimore along the present US 61 and following I-94 between Black River Falls and Osseo.

Route description
In southern Crawford County, WIS 27 begins at a junction with US 18, WIS 60 and WIS 35 in Prairie du Chien.  The highway turns north after a three-mile (5 km) northeast stretch out of the city and passes through Eastman and Mount Sterling.  After entering Vernon County, WIS 27 converges with Wisconsin Highway 82 and turns northeast in Fargo.  The two highways continue concurrent for seven miles (11 km) and turn northwest onto US 14 and US 61.  WIS 82 turns east off the concurrency in downtown Viroqua at the junction with WIS 56 west.  WIS 27 turns north off the concurrency with the U.S. Highways in Westby and crosses into Monroe County near Newry.  The highway crosses WIS 33 in Cashton, Wisconsin and passes through Melvina before crossing I-90 just south of Sparta.  In downtown Sparta, WIS 27 crosses WIS 16.  The junction is also the west terminus of WIS 21 and the point where WIS 71 west joins WIS 27 heading north.  WIS 71 west follows WIS 16 east.  WIS 71 turns westward off the highway near Four Corners.  WIS 27 enters Jackson County seven miles (11 km) north of the WIS 71 West junction.

WIS 27 junctions with US 12 east on the south side of Black River Falls.  The two highways run concurrent through the city and junction with WIS 54 in the city center and I-94 on the north side.  US 12 and WIS 27 cross WIS 95 in Merrillan and enter Clark County four miles (6 km) north of Merrillan.  The two highway pass through Humbird and turn west onto US 10 and pass back into Jackson County. After entering Eau Claire County, US 12 and WIS 27 turn northwest off US 10 in Fairchild.  WIS 27 turns north off US 12 in Augusta. The highway crosses WIS 29 five miles (8 km) north of the Chippewa County line in Cadott. and junctions with WIS 64 in Cornell.  WIS 27 enters Rusk County five miles (8 km) north of Holcombe.

The entire stretch of WIS 27 is due north–south and passes through only one city, Ladysmith, midway through the county. WIS 27 crosses US 8 in Ladysmith.  Eleven miles after crossing into Sawyer County, WIS 27 turns west onto WIS 70 in Ojibwa.  The two highways pass through Radisson and Couderay along a stair-stepped northwest trek.  WIS 27 turns north off the concurrency near Sand Lake  The highway junctions with US 63 and WIS 77 in Hayward.  WIS 77 west follows WIS 27 north for three miles (5 km) north of Hayward.  WIS 27 enters Bayfield County seven miles (11 km) north of the WIS 77 west junction.  WIS 27 passes through the county for  before turning west into Douglas County  WIS 27 turns north again and continues to its north terminus is at a junction with US 2 in Brule

History
When first added as part of the original Wisconsin state trunkline in 1918, WIS 27's northern terminus was at Sparta.  It was extended further to WIS 12 at Shamrock in the early 1920s.  It was extended to follow the current routing through Hayward (with the exception of the portion through Rusk and Sawyer counties to Radisson) - where it followed present day WIS 77 and US 53 (then WIS 11) to Superior in 1924.  When US 61 was added in the late 1920s, WIS 27 was re-routed to Fennimore from Viroqua until 1932 - when it was restored to its original routing to Prairie du Chien.  The present route in Rusk and Sawyer Counties was opened in the late 1940s and the section north of Hayward was rerouted along the present alignment in 1948.  The section of WIS 27 between Black River falls and Augusta was rerouted to follow I-94 between Hixton and Osseo in 1967, but was relocated back to the section following US 12 in 1972.

Major intersections

See also

References

External links

027
Transportation in Crawford County, Wisconsin
Transportation in Vernon County, Wisconsin
Transportation in Monroe County, Wisconsin
Transportation in Jackson County, Wisconsin
Transportation in Clark County, Wisconsin
Transportation in Eau Claire County, Wisconsin
Transportation in Chippewa County, Wisconsin
Transportation in Rusk County, Wisconsin
Transportation in Sawyer County, Wisconsin
Transportation in Bayfield County, Wisconsin
Transportation in Douglas County, Wisconsin